Charles L. Chase was an American politician from Minnesota.

Born in New York, Chase served as the fourth and last secretary of Minnesota Territory from April 23, 1857 until May 24, 1858. He was elected to the Minnesota Constitutional Convention of 1857. In 1876, Chase served in the Minnesota House of Representatives from Dodge County, Minnesota and was a farmer.

Notes

People from New York (state)
People from Dodge County, Minnesota
Minnesota Territory officials
Members of the Minnesota House of Representatives
Year of birth missing
Year of death missing